Nathan Fox may refer to:

Nathan Fox (comics) (born 1975), American comics artist, working on Dark Reign amongst others
Nathan Fox (footballer) (born 1992), English footballer
Nathan Fox (psychologist), American neuroscientist
Nathan Fox (triple jumper) (born 1990), English triple jumper